South Boulevard, (shortened to South Blvd) is a station on the Chicago Transit Authority's 'L' system, on the Purple Line at 602 South Boulevard in Evanston, Illinois (directional coordinates 525 north, 500 west).

In 1931, the old Calvary station was replaced by South Boulevard and it was opened on July 1, 1931. Designed by Arthur U. Gerber, South Boulevard consists of a winding central platform to the shape of the street that overlooks. It is now very similar to the original station, only catenary maintained by steel arches disappeared in 1973 during the installation of an electric rail to the ground while the lighting was renewed in 1998. For the rest, except for renovation from 2004 to 2005, the structure has not changed.

History

The current station has been in place since July 1, 1931, when it replaced the Calvary Cemetery stop to the south, to better serve the developing residential area directly to the north of the cemetery.  The station has only received little renovation since then, like new lighting and signage.

The closure of the South Boulevard station (along with Foster) appeared as part of three of the CTA's six potential options for the renovation of the Purple Line and northern section of the Red Line.

Bus connections
CTA
  206 Evanston Circulator (school days only)

Pace
  213 Green Bay Road (Monday–Saturday only)

Notes and references

Notes

References

External links 
 Train schedule (PDF) at CTA official site
 South Boulevard Station Page at Chicago-L.Org
 South Boulevard Station Page CTA official site
 South Boulevard entrance from Google Maps Street View

CTA Purple Line stations
Railway stations in Evanston, Illinois
Railway stations in the United States opened in 1931